Michael John Knight Smith , better known as M. J. K. Smith or Mike Smith, (born 30 June 1933) is an English former cricketer who was captain of Oxford University Cricket Club (1956), Warwickshire County Cricket Club (1957–1967) and the England cricket team (1963–1966). He was one of England's most popular cricket captains and, as he also played rugby union, Smith was England's last double international.

University

Born at Westcotes, Leicester, Smith was educated at Stamford School and St Edmund Hall, Oxford, where he read geography. He was president of Vincent's Club in 1956. While at university in 1951–55 he played in the summer for Leicestershire County Cricket Club, the county of his birth. Smith came to prominence playing for Oxford University, scoring centuries in three consecutive Varsity matches against Cambridge, from 1954 to 1956. He also represented England at rugby union against Wales in 1956. He remains England's last double international to date in major sports by reference to his final appearance in 1972. Arthur Milton, a double international in football and cricket, is later in terms of his first appearance in a second sport, making his Test debut six weeks after Smith.

Warwickshire captain

Smith was encouraged to move to Warwickshire County Cricket Club in 1957 to take over the captaincy. In the 1950s an amateur had to captain the county and Warwickshire had no capable amateurs. Despite wearing steel-rimmed spectacles Smith was a heavy run-maker in County cricket and passed 2,000 runs a season each year from 1957 to 1962, including 3,245 runs (57.94) in 1959. Fred Trueman thought "there is probably nobody in the world who plays the off-spinner better", but Smith's fragility against fast bowling meant that he could not hold down a regular place in the Test team. It was not his only failing as 'Mike is widely remembered...as a very unreliable runner between the wickets. Warwickshire tales of woe in this respect are numerous and I can remember a call between them in 1964 going something like "No A.C." – Yes, Mike" – Wait A.C." – "Damn it, Mike" – "Sorry A.C." He was, however, a mantis-like close fielder who took a record 593 catches for Warwickshire and 53 catches in 50 Tests for England. His outwardly nonchalant captaincy hid a good cricketing brain and he took a rebuilt Warwickshire side to third, fourth and second place in the County Championship in 1962–64.

Early England career

Mike Smith was called up as a makeshift opener against New Zealand in 1958, making 0 and 7 on debut on his home ground at Edgbaston in the First Test. In the Second Test at Lord's he took 230 minutes to make 47 in a match where England (269) beat New Zealand (47 and 74) by an innings on a poor wicket. In the Third Test at Headingley Smith made 3 and was dropped. Recalled as a top order batsman against India in 1959 he made his maiden Test century, 100 in the Fourth Test at Old Trafford followed by 98 in the Fifth Test at the Oval. He played his first full series in the West Indies in 1959–60, making 39 in the First Test, 108 in 350 minutes in England's 256 run victory in the Second Test, taking longer to reach three figures than the notorious stonewaller Ken Barrington. Thereafter his weakness against quality fast bowling was exposed by Wes Hall and Chester Watson with innings of 12, 0, 10, 0, 23 and 20, but he recovered with 96 in the second innings of the Fifth Test, adding 197 for the seventh wicket with the wicketkeeper Jim Parks.

Smith was one of many signatories in a letter to The Times on 17 July 1958 opposing 'the policy of apartheid' in international sport and defending 'the principle of racial equality which is embodied in the Declaration of the Olympic Games'. Against South Africa in 1960 he started well with 54 and 28 in the First Test and top-scoring with 99 in the Second Test, where England won by an innings on another poor wicket. This was followed by 0, 0 and 11 and the next year against Australia he was out for a duck in the First Test at Edgbaston when the part-time bowler Ken Mackay took 3 wickets in four balls and he was dropped for the rest of the summer. It was thought that Smith would do better in India and Pakistan on the MCC tour of 1961–62 and he made another 99 in the First Test against Pakistan, having come in at 21/2 and adding 192 with Ken Barrington. This stood him in good stead as he made three successive ducks against India before recovering with 73 when recalled for the Fifth Test. Despite his powerful run-making in the County Championship Smith's batting was classed as fragile and he was dropped from the England team for three years.

England captain

Smith captained England in 25 of his 50 Test match appearances, but in a period rich in batting talent he was rarely guaranteed a place. His uncertainty against fast bowling was exposed by a series of low scores in the mid-1960s, and Smith faced considerable press criticism, unusual for the time. Still, he was a good tourist and was made captain of the England tour of India in 1963–64 when Ted Dexter and Colin Cowdrey were unavailable and without England's top bowlers Brian Statham and Fred Trueman. He lost the toss five times in a row and had so many injuries and illnesses that in the Second Test at Madras Smith had to use three batsmen, two wicket-keepers and six bowlers. When Mickey Stewart was unable to play after the first day because of dysentery he seriously considered calling up the cricket journalist Henry Blofeld, but managed to survive with just 10 men. Smith became the first England captain to draw all five Tests in a series (it was the third time India had done this) and was considered to have done well to avoid defeat. It was his best series with 306 runs (51.00) and when Ted Dexter retired after losing 1–0 to Bobby Simpson's Australia in 1964 Smith was made captain for England's last tour of South Africa before the Basil d'Oliveira Crisis. He won 1–0 against the talented Springboks, the last captain to defeat them in a Test series until 1996–97. It was also a personal success as he took four catches in the vital First Test and 10 in the series. He also made his third and last Test century, a top-score of 121 in England's 442 as they replied to South Africa's 501/7 in the Third Test, and finished with 257 runs (42.83). Wisden said, 'MCC have sent more powerful teams from Lord's than this one, but never one superior in terms of corporate effort on the playing pitch and harmony in the pavilion.'

Back in England in 1965, Smith beat a weak New Zealand 3–0, then lost 1–0 to South Africa, but was appointed captain for the MCC tour of Australia in 1965-66 with Cowdrey as vice-captain, despite support for the Kent captain at Lord's. Although the press labelled the England team as the weakest to go to Australia, their entertaining cricket won them favour with the crowds. They also made their runs faster than any other England team since the war and for once England batted faster than Australia, a refreshing contrast to other Ashes series of the era. The tourists had had the best run of games of any MCC team since the war, beating Western Australia, South Australia and New South Wales, drawing with Queensland, when they needed two more wickets to win, and losing to Victoria by 32 runs after an exciting run-chase. As a result, the bookies reduced the odds of their winning the Ashes from 7/2 to evens. England survived the follow on in the First Test and made 558 in the Second, both drawn. At Sydney in the Third Test England rattled up 488 and won by an innings and 93 runs to give them a 1–0 lead in the series. It was Australia's biggest defeat at home for nearly 50 years, but they fought back to win the Fourth Test by an innings and retained the Ashes. Rain ruined play in New Zealand and the three Test series was drawn 0–0 despite the home team suffering at the hands of the England bowlers. On his return to England Smith was dropped after losing the First Test against the West Indies in 1966 by an innings. He was replaced by Cowdrey and retired at the end of the following season.

Captaincy style and popularity

...he strolled in with an open-necked shirt, a white linen jacket which appeared to have been slept in for a week and a carry-cot containing a slumbering junior member of the Smith dynasty. Apparently Mrs Smith had gone shopping and M.J.K. was left holding the baby. Despite an Oxford education his accent was utterly classless and between questions to which he appeared to be paying no attention whatever, he applied himself to solving the crossword in the latest Times to arrive from Britain. "Good heavens", growled one of Australia's senior cricket correspondents, "what have we here?" What we all had on that tour was the affable companionship of one of the most popular England captains ever to tour anywhere. It never occurred to him to leave the baby, let alone his wife, at home while he led the fight for the Ashes.
Ian Wooldridge

Unlike his predecessors Len Hutton, Peter May and Ted Dexter Smith rode "... the side with a loose rein, believing it knew where it was going and need only an occasional tug to keep it on the right course. I think most players appreciated this and his openness as a person brought a better response on the field". He thought that any bowler good enough to play for England knew what field suited him best, and generally let his men play in their own style, though this resulted in slow over rates as he did not chivvy them along. Even the truculent fast bowler John Snow "...thought he was very astute in his handling of players..." and recalled "...Mike Smith adding a few words of congratulations in his thoroughly open, absent-minded-professor sort of way". E.W. Swanton reported that "Smith, though outwardly unconventional and in manner casual to a degree, succeeds as a captain for the conventional reasons. He is thoughtful for his players, unselfish, does not 'fuss' them or panic, shows a grasp of the situation which they deem generally sensible, and not least gives an inspiring personal lead in the field".

Later career

Smith returned to Warwickshire in 1970 and did well enough to be recalled for England for the first three Tests against Australia in 1972 before finally retiring in 1975. In recent years he has been chairman of Warwickshire County Cricket Club (1991–2003) and an ICC match referee (1991–1996).

Family
His son Neil followed in his footsteps by captaining Warwickshire and playing, albeit only in One Day Internationals, for England. His daughter Carole is the wife of Sebastian Coe.

Bibliography
 Ken Kelly and David Lemmon, Cricket Reflections: Five Decades of Cricket Photographs, Heinemann, 1985
 John Snow, Cricket Rebel: An Autobiography, Littlehampton Book Services Ltd, 1976
 E.W. Swanton, Swanton in Australia with MCC 1946–1975, Fontana, 1977
 Fred Titmus, My Life in Cricket, Blake Publishing, 2005
 Brown, Geoff and Hogsbjerg, Christian. Apartheid is not a Game: Remembering the Stop the Seventy Tour campaign. London: Redwords, 2020. .

References

External links

Mike Smith interviewed on Cricinfo in 2012

1933 births
Living people
Aldershot Services rugby union players
Alumni of St Edmund Hall, Oxford
Cricket match referees
English cricketers
England Test cricketers
English cricketers of 1946 to 1968
England Test cricket captains
English rugby union players
England international rugby union players
International Cavaliers cricketers
Leicestershire cricketers
Officers of the Order of the British Empire
Oxford University cricketers
Oxford University RFC players
People educated at Stamford School
Warwickshire cricketers
Warwickshire cricket captains
Wisden Cricketers of the Year
Gentlemen cricketers
Marylebone Cricket Club cricketers
Gentlemen of England cricketers
D. H. Robins' XI cricketers
T. N. Pearce's XI cricketers
Rugby union players from Leicestershire